Phinehas was son of Eleazar and grandson of Aaron the High Priest.

Phinehas, Pinhas, or Pinchas may also refer to:

People

Hophni and Phinehas, two sons of the High Priest Eli, a priest at Shiloh who died when the Philistines captured the Ark of the Covenant
Phinehas ben Jair, early Jewish rabbi of the 2nd century
Pinkhos Churgin (1894-1957), first President of Bar-Ilan University
Pinhas Gershon, Israeli basketball coach
Pinhas Hozez (born 1957), Israeli basketball player
Pinchas Lapide (1922-1997), Jewish theologian and Israeli historian
Pinchas Sadeh (1929–1994), Polish-born Israeli novelist and poet
Pinchas Sapir (1906–1975), Israeli politician
Pinchas Zukerman (born 1948), Israeli violinist, violist, and conductor

Other 
Pinechas (parsha), the 41st weekly Torah portion
Phineas Priesthood, a Christian Identity movement
Phinehas (band), a band from La Mirada, California
Phinehas (EP), an EP by the band of the same name

See also 
 Phineas (disambiguation)